Kenneth Montgomery OBE (28 October 1943 – 5 March 2023) was a British conductor.

The only child of Lily and Tom Montgomery, his upbringing was in Wandsworth Parade, Belfast, and he attended the Royal Belfast Academical Institution. His musical studies were at the Royal College of Music. He studied with Sir Adrian Boult, and later continued to study conducting with Hans Schmidt-Isserstedt, Sergiu Celibidache, and Sir John Pritchard. His early conducting engagements included work at Glyndebourne Festival Opera, as an assistant conductor, assistant choral conductor and rehearsal pianist.  He later served on the conducting staff at Sadler's Wells Opera.

In 1973, Montgomery became music director of the Bournemouth Sinfonietta.  He was music director of Glyndebourne Touring Opera from 1975 to 1976, and continued with the ensemble as a guest conductor. In 1985, he became both artistic and musical director of Opera Northern Ireland. With the Ulster Orchestra, Montgomery served as its principal guest conductor, and in September 2006, the orchestra announced him as their principal conductor effective in September 2007, the first Belfast-born musician named as the orchestra's principal conductor. He concluded his principal conductorship of the Ulster Orchestra at the end of his three-year contract in 2010.

Outside of the UK, in 1975, Montgomery was named principal conductor of the Dutch Radio Symphony Orchestra, and from 1985 to 1989 held the same post with the orchestra under its newer name of the Netherlands Radio Symphony. Later, he was appointed the director of the Dutch Radio Choir (Groot Omroepkoor). In 1991, he became director of opera studies at the Royal Conservatory in The Hague. He continued to make his home in the Netherlands, where he died in 2023. 

From 1982, Montgomery was a regular guest conductor at Santa Fe Opera (SFO).  In May 2007, Santa Fe Opera named Montgomery its interim music director, succeeding Alan Gilbert.  Montgomery's tenure as interim music director concluded after the 2007 season, with the naming of Edo de Waart as SFO's chief conductor effective 1 October 2007.  In April 2013, Montgomery was named SFO conductor laureate for the 2013 season.

Montgomery was appointed Officer of the Order of the British Empire (OBE) in the 2010 New Year Honours. He died in Amsterdam on 5 March 2023, at the age of 79.

References

External links
 Kenneth Montgomery's website
 Biography from the Ulster Orchestra web site
 Interview with Kenneth Montgomery by Maria Nocklin, "Music & Vision" website, January 2006.
 

1943 births
2023 deaths
Conductors (music) from Northern Ireland
Male conductors (music)
Musicians from Belfast
Officers of the Order of the British Empire
21st-century conductors (music)
21st-century male musicians